The Municipality of Pesnica is a municipality in northeastern Slovenia. The seat of the municipality is Pesnica pri Mariboru, a suburb near Maribor. It lies at the western end of the Slovene Hills in the Upper Pesnica Valley. The area is part of the traditional region of Styria. It is now included in the Drava Statistical Region as part of the Pesnica Administrative Unit. The main economic activities in the area are tourism, transportation, viticulture, winemaking, craftsmanship and farming.

Settlements
In addition to the municipal seat of Pesnica pri Mariboru, the municipality also includes the following settlements:

 Dolnja Počehova
 Dragučova
 Drankovec
 Flekušek
 Gačnik
 Jareninski Dol
 Jareninski Vrh
 Jelenče
 Kušernik
 Ložane
 Mali Dol
 Pernica
 Pesniški Dvor
 Počenik
 Polička Vas
 Polički Vrh
 Ranca
 Ročica
 Slatenik
 Spodnje Dobrenje
 Spodnje Hlapje
 Spodnji Jakobski Dol
 Vajgen
 Vosek
 Vukovje
 Vukovski Dol
 Vukovski Vrh
 Zgornje Hlapje
 Zgornji Jakobski Dol

Notable people
Notable people from Pesnica include:
 Rene Krhin (born 1990), a football player
 Jan Muršak (born 1988), a hockey player
 Tone Partljič (born 1940), a writer, screenwriter, and politician
  (1961–1992), a writer and journalist who was killed in Sarajevo during the war

References

External links
 
 Municipality of Pesnica on Geopedia
 Pesnica municipal site

 
Pesnica
Pesnica
1994 establishments in Slovenia